Pandamonium is an American animated television series that aired on CBS. It was the first non-Tom and Jerry-related animated television series made by MGM Television, and was one of the last Saturday morning cartoon series to be fitted with a laugh track. The show ended after 13 episodes.

Synopsis 
When an evil alien named Mondraggor (voiced by William Woodson) attempted to steal an ancient object called the Pyramid of Power, the pyramid shattered into many pieces, which scattered around the world. Each week, Mondraggor would race against two human siblings, Peter and Peggy Darrow, who were accompanied by three talking pandas named Chesty, Timothy, and Algernon, who were irradiated by the Pyramid's magic. The three of them can unite to form Poppapanda, a being with supernatural power.

In the air, Mondraggor possessed control over wind, fire, thunder and lightning. On Earth, however, all of his powers disappeared except for his ability to control people's minds, leading him to brainwash several people in his attempt to claim the pyramid pieces.

The series was canceled after one season before all of the pieces of the Pyramid of Power were successfully found by the human and panda team. However, they did manage to collect enough pieces by the end of the series to be able to take advantage of their power to a degree in times of need.

Episodes

References

External links 
 
 Pandamonium at the Big Cartoon DataBase

1982 American television series debuts
1983 American television series endings
CBS original programming
1980s American animated television series
English-language television shows
Television series by MGM Television
American children's animated action television series
American children's animated adventure television series
American children's animated fantasy television series
Television series by Marvel Productions
Television series about pandas